In mathematics, K-theory is, roughly speaking, the study of a ring generated by vector bundles over a topological space or scheme. In algebraic topology, it is a cohomology theory known as topological K-theory. In algebra and algebraic geometry, it is referred to as algebraic K-theory. It is also a fundamental tool in the field of operator algebras. It can be seen as the study of certain kinds of invariants of large matrices.

K-theory involves the construction of families of K-functors that map from topological spaces or schemes to associated rings; these rings reflect some aspects of the structure of the original spaces or schemes. As with functors to groups in algebraic topology, the reason for this functorial mapping is that it is easier to compute some topological properties from the mapped rings than from the original spaces or schemes. Examples of results gleaned from the K-theory approach include the Grothendieck–Riemann–Roch theorem, Bott periodicity, the Atiyah–Singer index theorem, and the Adams operations.

In high energy physics, K-theory and in particular twisted K-theory have appeared in Type II string theory where it has been conjectured that they classify D-branes, Ramond–Ramond field strengths and also certain spinors on generalized complex manifolds. In condensed matter physics K-theory has been used to classify topological insulators, superconductors and stable Fermi surfaces. For more details, see K-theory (physics).

Grothendieck completion

The Grothendieck completion of an abelian monoid into an abelian group is a necessary ingredient for defining K-theory since all definitions start by constructing an abelian monoid from a suitable category and turning it into an abelian group through this universal construction. Given an abelian monoid  let  be the relation on  defined by

if there exists a  such that  Then, the set  has the structure of a group  where:

Equivalence classes in this group should be thought of as formal differences of elements in the abelian monoid.

To get a better understanding of this group, consider some equivalence classes of the abelian monoid .

This should give us the hint that we should be thinking of the equivalence classes  as formal differences  Another useful observation is the invariance of equivalence classes under scaling:

 for any 

The Grothendieck completion can be viewed as a functor  and it has the property that it is left adjoint to the corresponding forgetful functor  That means that, given a morphism  of an abelian monoid  to the underlying abelian monoid of an abelian group  there exists a unique abelian group morphism

Example for natural numbers 
We can see that  For any pair  we can find a minimal representative  by using the invariance under scaling. For example, we can see from the scaling invariance that

In general, if  then 

 which is of the form  or 

Definitions

There are a number of basic definitions of K-theory: two coming from topology and two from algebraic geometry.

Grothendieck group for compact Hausdorff spaces 
Since isomorphism classes of vector bundles behave well with respect to direct sums, we can write these operations on isomorphism classes by

It should be clear that  is an abelian monoid where the unit is given by the trivial vector bundle . We can then apply the Grothendieck completion to get an abelian group from this abelian monoid.

We can use the Serre–Swan theorem and some algebra to get an alternative description of vector bundles over the ring of continuous complex-valued functions  as projective modules. Then, these can be identified with idempotent matrices in some ring of matrices . We can define equivalence classes of idempotent matrices and form an abelian monoid . Its Grothendieck completion is also called . One of the main techniques for computing the Grothendieck group for topological spaces comes from the Atiyah–Hirzebruch spectral sequence, which makes it very accessible. The only required computations for understanding the spectral sequences are computing the group  for the spheres .pg 51-110

Grothendieck group of vector bundles in algebraic geometry 
There is an analogous construction by considering vector bundles in algebraic geometry. Then, as before, the direct sum  of isomorphisms classes of vector bundles is well-defined, giving an abelian monoid . Then, the Grothendieck group  is defined by the application of the Grothendieck construction on this abelian monoid.

Grothendieck group of coherent sheaves in algebraic geometry 
In algebraic geometry, the same construction can be applied to algebraic vector bundles over a smooth scheme. But, there is an alternative construction for any Noetherian scheme . If we look at the isomorphism classes of coherent sheaves  we can mod out by the relation  if there is a short exact sequence

This gives the Grothendieck-group  which is isomorphic to  if  is smooth. The group  is special because there is also a ring structure: we define it as

Using the Grothendieck–Riemann–Roch theorem, we have that

is an isomorphism of rings. Hence we can use  for intersection theory.

Early history

The subject can be said to begin with Alexander Grothendieck (1957), who used it to formulate his Grothendieck–Riemann–Roch theorem.  It takes its name from the German Klasse, meaning "class".  Grothendieck needed to work with coherent sheaves on an algebraic variety X. Rather than working directly with the sheaves, he defined a group using isomorphism classes of sheaves as generators of the group, subject to a relation that identifies any extension of two sheaves with their sum. The resulting group is called K(X) when only locally free sheaves are used, or G(X) when all are coherent sheaves. Either of these two constructions is referred to as the Grothendieck group; K(X) has cohomological behavior and G(X) has homological behavior.

If X is a smooth variety, the two groups are the same. If it is a smooth affine variety, then all extensions of locally free sheaves split, so the group has an alternative definition.

In topology, by applying the same construction to vector bundles, Michael Atiyah and Friedrich Hirzebruch defined K(X) for a topological space X in 1959, and using the Bott periodicity theorem they made it the basis of an extraordinary cohomology theory. It played a major role in the second proof of the Atiyah–Singer index theorem (circa 1962). Furthermore, this approach led to a noncommutative K-theory for C*-algebras.

Already in 1955, Jean-Pierre Serre had used the analogy of vector bundles with projective modules to formulate Serre's conjecture, which states that every finitely generated projective module over a polynomial ring is free; this assertion is correct, but was not settled until 20 years later. (Swan's theorem is another aspect of this analogy.)

Developments
The other historical origin of algebraic K-theory was the work of J. H. C. Whitehead and others on what later became known as Whitehead torsion.

There followed a period in which there were various partial definitions of higher K-theory functors. Finally, two useful and equivalent definitions were given by Daniel Quillen using homotopy theory in 1969 and 1972. A variant was also given by Friedhelm Waldhausen in order to study the algebraic K-theory of spaces, which is related to the study of pseudo-isotopies.  Much modern research on higher K-theory is related to algebraic geometry and the study of motivic cohomology.

The corresponding constructions involving an auxiliary quadratic form received the general name L-theory. It is a major tool of surgery theory.

In string theory, the K-theory classification of Ramond–Ramond field strengths and the charges of stable D-branes was first proposed in 1997.

Examples and properties

K0 of a field 
The easiest example of the Grothendieck group is the Grothendieck group of a point  for a field . Since a vector bundle over this space is just a finite dimensional vector space, which is a free object in the category of coherent sheaves, hence projective, the monoid of isomorphism classes is  corresponding to the dimension of the vector space. It is an easy exercise to show that the Grothendieck group is then .

K0 of an Artinian algebra over a field 
One important property of the Grothendieck group of a Noetherian scheme  is that it is invariant under reduction, hence . For example,

K0 of projective space 
This is because the intersection numbers of a projective  can be computed by embedding  and using the push pull formula . This makes it possible to do concrete calculations with elements in  without having to explicitly know its structure since

One technique for determining the Grothendieck group of  comes from its stratification as

K0 of a projective bundle 
Another important formula for the Grothendieck group is the projective bundle formula: given a rank r vector bundle  over a Noetherian scheme , the Grothendieck group of the projective bundle  is a free -module of rank r with basis . In addition, this can be used to compute the Grothendieck group  by observing it is a projective bundle over the field .

K0 of singular spaces and spaces with isolated quotient singularities 
This is done using the Grothendieck group of the Singularity category  from derived noncommutative algebraic geometry. It gives a long exact sequence starting with

where the higher terms come from higher K-theory. Note that vector bundles on a singular  are given by vector bundles  on the smooth locus . This makes it possible to compute the Grothendieck group on weighted projective spaces since they typically have isolated quotient singularities. In particular, if these singularities have isotropy groups  then the map

K0 of a smooth projective curve 
For a smooth projective curve  the Grothendieck group is

This follows from the Brown-Gersten-Quillen spectral sequencepg 72  of algebraic K-theory. For a regular scheme of finite type over a field, there is a convergent spectral sequence

for  the set of codimension  points, meaning the set of subschemes  of codimension , and  the algebraic function field of the subscheme. This spectral sequence has the propertypg 80

The coniveau filtration can then be used to determine  as the desired explicit direct sum since it gives an exact sequence

Since , we have the sequence of abelian groups above splits, giving the isomorphism.

Moreover, the techniques above using the derived category of singularities for isolated singularities can be extended to isolated Cohen-Macaulay singularities, giving techniques for computing the Grothendieck group of any singular algebraic curve. This is because reduction gives a generically smooth curve, and all singularities are Cohen-Macaulay.

Applications

Virtual bundles
One useful application of the Grothendieck-group is to define virtual vector bundles. For example, if we have an embedding of smooth spaces  then there is a short exact sequence

If we have a singular space  embedded into a smooth space  we define the virtual conormal bundle as

Another useful application of virtual bundles is with the definition of a virtual tangent bundle of an intersection of spaces: Let  be projective subvarieties of a smooth projective variety. Then, we can define the virtual tangent bundle of their intersection  as

Kontsevich uses this construction in one of his papers.

Chern characters

Chern classes can be used to construct a homomorphism of rings from the topological K-theory of a space to (the completion of) its rational cohomology. For a line bundle L, the Chern character ch is defined by

More generally, if  is a direct sum of line bundles, with first Chern classes  the Chern character is defined additively

The Chern character is useful in part because it facilitates the computation of the Chern class of a tensor product. The Chern character is used in the Hirzebruch–Riemann–Roch theorem.

Equivariant K-theory
The equivariant algebraic K-theory is an algebraic K-theory associated to the category  of equivariant coherent sheaves on an algebraic scheme  with action of a linear algebraic group ,  via Quillen's Q-construction; thus, by definition,

The theory was developed by R. W. Thomason in 1980s. Specifically, he proved equivariant analogs of fundamental theorems such as the localization theorem.

See also
Bott periodicity
KK-theory
KR-theory
List of cohomology theories
Algebraic K-theory
Topological K-theory
Operator K-theory
Grothendieck–Riemann–Roch theorem

Notes

References

External links 
 Grothendieck-Riemann-Roch
 Max Karoubi's Page
 K-theory preprint archive